Treacher Methodist Girls' School (abbreviated TMGS; formerly known as Lady Treacher Girls' School) is located at Museum Road (Jalan Muzium) off Walker Road (Jalan Temenggung) in Taiping, Perak, Malaysia.

History

Lady Treacher Girls’ School was the first English girls’ school in the Federated Malay States and was established in 1889 in Taiping, Perak. Its first name was English Government Girls’ School. The school’s establishment was devoted to Lady Treacher who was the wife of the then British Resident of Perak, Sir William Hood Treacher.

Establishing a girls’ school was Lady Treacher’s ambition and passion; she embodied herself to raise funds for building the school and work hard to make it a success. In 1889, a small wooden building was erected and able to accommodate eight students. After ten years, in 1898, the Perak State Government lost its interest to fund the school. Hence, in 1899, Lady Treacher held a meeting with Bishop James Thoburn to put the school under missionaries' care. On 4 May 1899, the decision was made that the school would be administrated by missionaries, and Mrs. Mary Carr Curtis from Penang became the first principal with 28 students at that time.

In 1901, during the tenured of Ms. Mary Cody, the school went under a major renovation and expanded its building. In 1902, the school changed its name to Lady Treacher Girls’ School to honour its early pioneer Lady Treacher. On the same year, a hostel was built and occupied by 25 students, and the school was under a new principal Ms. Catherine Ethel Jackson with 41 students.

In 1908, the school had prepared six girls for the standard six examinations for the first time. When World War I was waged in Europe, the school continued to operate normally, and the 1918 student enrollment count increased to 108. In 1899, a primary school, bearing the name Lady Treacher Girls’ School, was established in Race Course Road. The school was later named Treacher Girls’ School. In 1901, the administration of the school was taken over by Methodists and renamed as Treacher Methodist Girls’ School. The school is located at Upper Museum Road, which is near the Perak Museum. The school was the first girls’ school to receive financial support from the state government since its establishment.

List of Principals

References

 Eugene Khoo, 2007 A History of Taiping, Malaysia
 Khoo Kay Kim, 2003, The Development of Taiping From 1876 Until World War II: Taiping The Vibrant Years, 
 E. C. Hicks, 1958, History of English Schools in Perak

External links
 

Primary schools in Malaysia
Secondary schools in Malaysia
Educational institutions established in 1889
1889 establishments in British Malaya
Publicly funded schools in Malaysia
Methodist schools in Malaysia
Girls' schools in Malaysia